Dördlər, Neftchala may refer to:

 Dördlər, Boyat, Azerbaijan
 Dördlər, Xol Qarabucaq, Azerbaijan